Casey Rain, also known as S-Endz and Turi is a British Asian vocalist, music producer, songwriter, YouTuber and radio presenter. He is best known as a member of the UK rap/alternative/bhangra band Swami and co-founder of the media collective The Violet Reality.

He was a vegetarian for several years and now adheres to a vegan diet.

History

Casey's first cousin Apache Indian broke the UK mainstream pop audience with a blend of bhangra and reggae produced by his cousins Simon "Subs" Duggal and Diamond "DJ Swami" Duggal. 
Subs & DJ Swami would later form the band Swami, which Casey would join as a vocalist in 2004.

Career

with Swami
Casey, as S-Endz, contributed rap vocals to many of the tracks on the 2004 Swami release DesiRock and all of the tracks on the 2005 remixed rap-rock version of the album, entitled So Who Am I released on Sony BMG. This album became a significant milestone for British Asian music, winning many awards. S-Endz himself was awarded with a "Rowdiest MC" award by BBC Radio 1 DJ's Bobby Friction & DJ Nihal in 2005.

When asked to describe his musical style in a 2005 interview with UKBhangra.com, Casey replied:

"My musical style as a vocalist and performer is like the bastard child of DMX and Courtney Love that was babysat by Slipknot and taught to create music by Prince, Kurt Cobain and Tupac Shakur and then genetically modified with the soul of Jason Voorhees while he's wielding a chainsaw."

In 2007, Swami released the album "Equalize" internationally through EMI/Virgin Records to great acclaim. BBC Music suggested it could be "the Desi album of the year" and SimplyBhangra called it "nothing short of a masterpiece."
The '4 Faces' album cover, featuring the outlines of Diamond, S-Endz, Sups and Bobby became the new Swami logo, appearing on flyers and merchandise. The album featured many international talents including Pras from The Fugees and South African R&B star Ishmael. In 2020, the song "Hey Hey" from this album was featured in the hit Netflix show Indian Matchmaking.

In Summer 2009, Swami began to promote an upcoming Greatest Hits compilation entitled "53431". The compilation includes two new songs, "Sugarless" and "Tonight" – both of which were co-written by and feature S-Endz. "Sugarless" was released as a free download in June 2009 to massive critical acclaim from fans and media alike. Indian music blog Bhangraw reported that this would be the last material from Swami that would include Punjabi vocals and that their next album would be entirely in English.

In March 2013, Swami released "Back It Up," the first single from their upcoming release UPGRADE. The song was written by S-Endz, DJ Swami and Liana McCarthy, features co-lead, chorus and rap vocals by S-Endz on the English Mix, and chorus/rap vocals on the Desi Mix. This was followed in 2014 by another single, Do It Again which was released with a music video shot in India. Both of these songs appeared in a remix form on two further Swami albums released in 2017, "Upgrade" and "Sidetrkd" on which S-Endz co-wrote and features on all songs.

Solo career
The USA/Canadian magazine ANOKHI featured an exclusive article about S-Endz in their Summer 2009 issue. The article states that Emanate will be released in the fall of 2009, and the first single "Do U Wanna Come"? will be released in the summer to coincide with a number of live shows.

In October 2009, S-Endz released his debut solo EP Outer Space. Reviews of the release were favorable, with leading Indian entertainment website DesiHits.com stating that "Unlike anything on the scene right now, Outer Space is truly a one of a kind track". Steven Anthony of The Musictionary gave the release a score of 7/10, stating that it "sounds incredibly fresh...like a cross between Trent Reznor and Kanye West, a sound that S-Endz has coined “Neofunk.” It’s different for sure, but more importantly it works and sounds like nothing you’ve heard before".

In April 2010, Radio New Zealand aired 'Urban Disturbance in Broadcasting House' – a documentary exploring the life and career of BBC Radio 1 DJ Zane Lowe. This documentary contained 3 original pieces of music by S-Endz.

It was announced, via YouTube clip in February 2011 that S-Endz has again collaborated with Kazz Kumar, creating a follow-up to her 2010 single 'Fashion'. The new version, entitled 'Fashion Part II (Neofunk Style)' was then released in the spring.

On 25 January 2012 S-Endz announced a new EP entitled 'Chapter 0 : REINKARNAL' and uploaded the cover artwork to his Tumblr page. The first song from the EP, 'Alone' was released on 11 February with subsequent songs being released every 2 weeks. The Birmingham Music Archive described the song "Do U Wanna Come" as "Deep South Bounce from Birmingham's very own Prince/Outkast."

As a presenter

In 2006, S-Endz presented a documentary about rap artist Tupac Shakur for British station BBC 1Xtra to mark the 10th anniversary of the artist's passing. The documentary contained interviews with Tupac's producers Johnny J and QD3 amongst others.

In 2011, S-Endz contributed to many documentaries in XFM's primetime "25" classic albums series – including co-producing and co-presenting an acclaimed episode about Prince & The Revolution's Parade.

In 2015, as Casey Rain, he co-founded The Violet Reality. Their YouTube channel has become the internet's primary source for updates and information on the career of Prince. In 2019, Casey Rain launched a radio show entitled "The Phaseshift" with his cousin and former bandmate DJ Swami for LA-based station Dash Radio.

As a writer
In August 2011, Casey Rain created the blog "Birmingham Riots 2011", to document the violent riots that occurred in the aftermath of the Death of Mark Duggan. The blog went viral, with 3 million hits in 3 days, and led to Casey being interviewed on the BBC, in The Economist magazine (who stated that police found themselves trailing Casey Rain in intelligence-gathering), and numerous international newspapers. This led to Casey becoming an official contributor to The Guardian newspaper. and his writing on the roots of violence was quoted on the popular Racialicious blog. In late 2011, Casey was given an award by the West Midlands Police in recognition of the blog's popularity.

In 2014, Casey wrote a review of a performance by pop artist Prince for the music blog Nada Brahma. This review was later quoted in official Prince live video from that night.

Other
In 2010, S-Endz appeared in the music documentary Made in Birmingham : Reggae Punk Bhangra – an independent documentary covering Birmingham's role in popular music. The documentary has been shown across the UK and is being submitted for international film festivals in 2011.

Discography
With Swami:
DesiRock (Roma II, 2004)
So Who Am I (Sony BMG, 2005)
Equalize (Virgin/EMI, 2007)
Electro Jugni/She's Mine (InGrooves, 2009)
53431 (Virgin/EMI, 2009)
Upgrade in Progress (DesiRock Ent, 2015)
Upgrade (DesiRock Ent, 2017)
Sidetrkd (DesiRock Ent, 2017)

Solo tracks released:
Giveit2me (released on MySpace)
Electric Man (originally released on MySpace and later on the Outer Space EP)
She's Like My Shadow (released on MySpace)
She's Like My Shadow (remix featuring Kidd Skilly) (released on S-Endz.com)
Dark Days (released on S-Endz.com)
 S-Endz VS Private – We Got Some Breaking Up To Do (released on DesiHits.com)

Solo albums and EP's
Outer Space EP (2009)
Chapter 0 : REINKARNAL (2012)

Guest appearances:
 featured on the remix to Swedish R'n'B artist Gigi's track "Masquerade" (2004)
 backing vocals on 'Get Loose!' by Apache Indian & Pras (2005)
 featured on 'O Sikander (International Dance Mix)' produced by DJ Swami from the smash-hit Bollywood movie 'Corporate' (2006)
 featured on DJ Camille Starr's remix of Amerie's Take Control (2007)
 featured on 'Wise in the Mind' by Fusing Naked Beats (2007)
 produced and featured on 'Fashion Part II (Neofunk Style)' by Kazz Kumar (2011)

Filmography

References

External links
Official site
Oct '05 Interview with S-Endz/Turi
Dec '07 Interview with Diamond/DJ Swami & S-Endz
Sept '09 Interview with Diamond/DJ Swami & S-Endz

Living people
English male rappers
People from Handsworth, West Midlands
Rappers from Birmingham, West Midlands
English people of Indian descent
Year of birth missing (living people)